Chivalrous Charley is a 1921 American silent comedy film directed by Robert Ellis and starring Eugene O'Brien, George Fawcett and Nancy Deaver.

Cast
 Eugene O'Brien as Charles Riley 
 George Fawcett as His Uncle 
 Nancy Deaver as Alice Sanderson 
 D.J. Flanagan as Her Father 
 Huntley Gordon as Geoffrey Small

References

Bibliography
 Munden, Kenneth White. The American Film Institute Catalog of Motion Pictures Produced in the United States, Part 1. University of California Press, 1997.

External links

1921 films
1921 comedy films
Silent American comedy films
Films directed by Robert Ellis
American silent feature films
1920s English-language films
American black-and-white films
Selznick Pictures films
1920s American films